Verri is an Italian surname. Notable people with the surname include:

 Alessandro Verri (1741–1816), Italian author
 Carlos Caetano Bledorn Verri (born 1963), Brazilian footballer and football manager better known as Dunga
 Francesco Verri (1885–1945), Italian track cycling racer
 Pietro Verri (1728–1797), Italian philosopher, economist, historian and writer
 members of the house Verri della Bosia:
 Karl Graf Verri della Bosia (1790–18??), Bavarian general
 Maximilian Graf von Verri della Bosia (1824–1909), Bavarian general

Other uses
Verri, Albania, a village in Shëngjergj municipality, Tirana County, Albania

Italian-language surnames